Lev Konov (born 11 February 1952 in Moscow) is a Russian composer, conductor, and producer. He graduated in Moscow Conservatory in 1980.

Operas

King Matt the First - the opera for/by children, the libretto is written on fairy tale by Janusz Korczak, the first execution: 1988 Russia, Moscow. Sound recording of an opera 1992.
Asgard - the opera for/by children, libretto by Lev Konov, written on Prose Edda (Younger Edda) by Snorri Sturluson.
The first execution: 1994, Russia, Moscow.
Olav Tryggvason, op.50 by Edvard Grieg is included in opera.

Kokin Wakashū - opera for/by children, libretto by Lev Konov, the first execution: 1996, Russia, Moscow.
The Ugly Duckling - Opera-Parable By Hans Christian Andersen For Mezzo-Soprano (Soprano), Three-part Children’s Choir And the Piano. 1 Act: 2 Epigraphs, 38 Theatrical Pictures Length: Approximately 26 minutes. The opera version (Free transcription) Written by Lev Konov (1996) On music of Sergei Prokofiev: “The Ugly Duckling”, op. 18 (1914) And “Visions Fugitives”, op. 22 (1915–1917)
(Vocal score language: Russian, English, German, French)

References

External links
Audios of Opera King Matt the First: Part 1 Part 2Part 3Part 4Part 5Part 6
Lev Konov’s Magical Childhood
Videos of Opera The Ugly Duckling: Part 1 Part 2Part 3
Opera "Asgard", score (Л. Конов-Э. Григ, синтез-опера "Асгард", клавир)

Living people
1952 births
Russian classical composers
Russian male classical composers
21st-century classical composers
20th-century classical composers
20th-century Russian male musicians
21st-century Russian male musicians